Mangy Hill is a summit in Aleutians West Census Area, Alaska, in the United States. It is on the island of Kiska.

Mangy Hill was so named because the U.S. military needed a name to begin with the letter M in order to fit with their alphabetical naming system.

References

Landforms of Aleutians West Census Area, Alaska
Mountains of Alaska
Mountains of Unorganized Borough, Alaska
Rat Islands